Francesco Stefani (January 23, 1923 in Offenburg – November 11, 1989 in Munich) was a German film director of Italian descent. Stefani lived in the Federal Republic of Germany and worked in the 1950s, mainly at children's film productions. He became famous with the film The Singing Ringing Tree, for which he led as a guest at the DEFA (GDR) Director. In 1980 he was awarded the Federal Cross of Merit, in 1983 the Bavarian Order of Merit.

External links

1923 births
1989 deaths
Film directors from Baden-Württemberg
People from Offenburg
German people of Italian descent
Recipients of the Cross of the Order of Merit of the Federal Republic of Germany